Seaweed is a generic name for various types of underwater algae.

The term may also refer to:
 Edible seaweed, algae that can be eaten or used in the preparation of food
 Seaweed (band), an American rock band
 Seaweed (musician), a rock musician
 Seaweed, stage name of Christopher Lenox-Smith, keyboard player for the Ozric Tentacles
 Silas Seaweed, a mystery book series by Stanley Evans (author)